The 2020 Setmana Ciclista Valenciana was a women's cycle stage race held in Spain from 20 to 23 February, 2020. The Setmana Ciclista Valenciana, being held for the fourth time, was held as a UCI rating of 2.2 race.

Route

Classification leadership table

References

External links

2020 in Australian sport
February 2020 sports events in Australia